The Lola T90 is a highly successful and competitive open-wheel racing car chassis, designed and built by Lola Cars to compete in USAC IndyCar racing series, that successfully won the 1966 Indianapolis 500, being driven by Graham Hill.

References 

Open wheel racing cars
American Championship racing cars
Lola racing cars